Rocket Arena may refer to:

 Rocket Arena (mod), a 1997 mod for the Quake video game series
 Rocket Arena (video game), a 2020 online third-person shooter video game